Mount Duncan is a  summit in British Columbia, Canada.

Description

Mount Duncan is located along the southern boundary of Glacier National Park and is part of the Battle Range, a subrange of the Selkirk Mountains. The mountain is situated at the head of the Duncan River which the mountain is named after. Precipitation runoff from the mountain drains north into headwaters of the Beaver River, and southeast to the Duncan River. Mount Duncan is more notable for its steep rise above local terrain than for its absolute elevation.

History

The mountain was named in 1890 by Harold Ward Topham, Emil Huber, and Henry Forster, in association with the Duncan River. The river is named for John (Jack) Duncan, an early prospector who worked claims along the lower reaches of the river that now bears his name. He was a candidate for the colonial Legislative Council from the Kootenay Land District in 1866, and died circa 1900. The mountain's toponym was officially adopted on July 29, 1904, by the Geographical Names Board of Canada.
 
The first ascent of the summit was made at 9:10 a.m. on August 25, 1913, by Edward W. D. Holway, Ernest Feus, and Christian Häsler. By 12:45 p.m. that same day, they were on the summit of Beaver Mountain one kilometer west and claiming another first ascent.

Climate

Based on the Köppen climate classification, Mount Duncan is located in a subarctic climate zone with cold, snowy winters, and mild summers. Winter temperatures can drop below −20 °C with wind chill factors below −30 °C. This climate supports the Duncan Névé on the north slope and Duncan Glacier on the east slope of the peak.

See also
Geography of British Columbia

References

External links
 Glacier National Park: Parks Canada
 Mount Duncan: Weather

Three-thousanders of British Columbia
Selkirk Mountains
Kootenay Land District
Glacier National Park (Canada)